601st may refer to:

601st (City of Bristol) (Mixed) Heavy Anti-Aircraft Regiment, Royal Artillery, a Volunteer unit of the British Army from 1859 to 1955
601st (Harwich) Fortress Company, Royal Engineers, a volunteer unit of Britain's Royal Engineers formed to defend the Essex coast
601st (The West Yorkshire Regiment) Infantry Regiment, Royal Artillery, a Volunteer unit of the British Army formed in 1859
601st Air Operations Center, US operations hub for First Air Force
601st Assault Helicopter Batallion, a helicopter unit of the Argentine Army
601st Bombardment Squadron Constituted as the 601st Bombardment Squadron (Heavy) on 15 February 1943
601st Communications Grouping (Argentina) (Agr Com 601), an Argentine Army signals military grouping
601st Engineer Grouping (Argentina) (Agr Ing 601), an Argentine Army Engineer grouping
601st Intelligence Batallion, a special military intelligence service of the Argentine Army
601st Naval Air Group, a carrier air group of the Imperial Japanese Navy (IJN) during World War II
601st Quartermaster Company, Aerial Delivery Support Company of the United States Army based in Aviano, Italy
601st Special Forces Group, a special forces unit of the Czech Armed Forces
601st Squadron (JASDF), a squadron of the Airborne Early Warning Surveillance Group of the Japan Air Self-Defense Force
601st Tactical Control Wing, provisional United States Air Force organization
601st Tank Destroyer Battalion, battalion of the United States Army active during World War II
The 601st Phone Call (第601个电话), a 2006 Chinese drama film

See also
601 (number)
601 (disambiguation)
601, the year 601 (DCI) of the Julian calendar
601 BC